Leonidas Kokas (born 3 June 1973) is a Greek weightlifter. His highest distinction was winning the silver medal in the 1996 Atlanta Olympic Games. He competed in the 94 kg category.

Life and sport results
Kokkas was born in Kakavie, Dropull, southern Albania, to an ethnic Greek family. 

In 1991, along with Pyrros Dimas, Giorgos Tzelilis, Leonidas Sabanis and Viktor Mitrou, Kokas left Albania for Greece. There, he joined Spartakos club of Ioannina. In 1996, he won Olympic silver, in Atlanta, in the 91 kg category. He lifted 215 kg in the jerk and 175 in the snatch for a second-place 390 kg total. 
He celebrated his win with close friend Pyrros Dimas, with whom he shared a room for the past several months. He also won silver in the 1997 Mediterranean Games, in the 91-kg category, by lifting 160 kg in the snatch. A serious injury forced him out of the 2000 Sydney Olympics.

Leonidas Kokas is now an Artillery Lieutenant in the Greek Army.

References

1973 births
Living people
Greek male weightlifters
Olympic weightlifters of Greece
Weightlifters at the 1996 Summer Olympics
Olympic silver medalists for Greece
Olympic medalists in weightlifting
Medalists at the 1996 Summer Olympics
Mediterranean Games gold medalists for Greece
Mediterranean Games medalists in weightlifting
Competitors at the 2001 Mediterranean Games
20th-century Greek people
21st-century Greek people
People from Dropull